Dean Cummings (born 30 March 1993) is a Scottish professional footballer currently playing as a midfielder for Lothian Thistle Hutchison Vale. Cummings has previously played for Falkirk, Livingston, Tynecastle and Edinburgh City, and is also the older brother of former Nottingham Forest forward Jason Cummings.

Career
Cummings Joined Livingston in July 2008 from Falkirk becoming a member of Livingston's under 19 squad. The youth side reached the 2010 SFL Youth Cup final with Cummings scoring the opening goal with the match resulting in a 2–1 defeat to Partick Thistle. During the tournament Cummings helped set a club record by scoring four goals in a 14–0 victory against Ayr United.

The following year the under-19 side won the league securing the title with a 10–0 victory against Stranaer. He signed a new two-year contract in April 2011 extending his stay until May 2013 and made his first team debut on 12 November 2011 as a substitute against Hamilton Academical. On 25 February 2012, he scored his first goal for the club in a 3–1 defeat to Ayr United.

After spells with Tynecastle and Lothian Thistle Hutchison Vale, Cummings signed for recently promoted Scottish League Two side Edinburgh City in June 2016. Cummings spent a season with Edinburgh City, before returning to Lothian Thistle for the 2017–18 season.

Career statistics

Personal life
Dean is the older brother of Hibs forward Jason Cummings, who, like his brother also played for Lothian Thistle Hutchison Vale.

References

External links

1993 births
Living people
Falkirk F.C. players
Livingston F.C. players
Lothian Thistle Hutchison Vale F.C. players
F.C. Edinburgh players
Scottish Football League players
National Premier Leagues players
Sorrento FC players
Association football midfielders
Scottish footballers
Stirling Macedonia FC players